The Philippines Women's National Softball Team, nicknamed the "Blu Girls", is the national team of Philippines. They are governed by the Amateur Softball Association of the Philippines. They won a bronze medal in 1970 ISF Women's World Championship in Osaka, Japan and it was their first medal won in a World Championship.

The Philippines is among the best teams in Southeast Asia having won the gold medal in every edition of the Southeast Asian Games which had women's softball event.

History
The Philippine women's team were a powerhouse in Asia never placing outside the top 10 in the global rankings during the 1970s although the Philippines always ranked behind Japan. Their greatest achievement at that time was the third-place finish at the Women's Softball World Championship in 1970. They placed fourth in the 1974 edition.

They are also a dominant force in Southeast Asia, having won all the gold medals in all editions of the Southeast Asian Games where women's softball was contested.

However, by the 1990s, the Philippine national team experienced a decline. The team competed at the 1990 ISF Women's World Championship in Normal, Illinois where they finished with 4 wins and 5 losses.  At the 1998 ISF Women's World Championship in Fujinomiya City, Japan where they finished sixteenth and only managed to secure a single win. The policy of the Philippine Sports Commission of dismantling the national training pool whenever a particular sport was scrapped from the calendar of events of the Southeast Asian Games, Asian Games, and the Olympics contributed to the women's softball team's decline.

In the 2000s, Raul Saberon, a businessman and a former men's national softball and baseball player, secured financial support for the women's softball team from Jean Henri Lhuillier, who later became head of the Amateur Softball Association of the Philippines.The team made a failed attempt to qualify for the 2006 Asian Games in Doha and the 2008 Summer Olympics in Beijing though made some progress.

At the 2017 Asian Women's Softball Championship, the Philippines finished second to Japan, the best finish of the country in 45 years. In doing so, they qualified for the Women's Softball World Championship and Asian Games in 2018.

Roster
National squad for the 2014 World Cup of Softball, July 7–13, 2014.

Head Coach: Randy Dizer

National squad for the 2017 World Cup of Softball, July 5–9, 2017.

Head Coach: Randy Dizer

Competition results

World Cup

Asian Games

Southeast Asian Games

References

External links 
 International Softball Federation

Women's national softball teams
Women's national sports teams of the Philippines
Softball in the Philippines